Caw is a hill in Cumbria, England, near the village of Seathwaite above the Duddon Valley, reaching  and having a trig point at the summit (OS grid SD231945). It is the subject of a chapter of Wainwright's book The Outlying Fells of Lakeland.

Caw is a Fellranger, being included in Mark Richards'  The Old Man of Coniston, Swirl How, Wetherlam and the South as one of the 18 (now 21) of his 227 (230 with the extension of the national park) summits which are not in Alfred Wainwright's list of 214. Richards describes it as "A great stand-alone fell with plenty to offer the explorer". It is also classified as a Birkett, Clem,  Dewey, Dodd, HuMP and Synge.

References

Fells of the Lake District